Nokia Internet Tablets is the name given to a range of Nokia mobile Internet appliances products.  These tablets fall in the range between a personal digital assistant (PDA) and an Ultra-Mobile PC (UMPC), and slightly below Intel's Mobile Internet device (MID).

Early trials and predecessors 
Nokia had plans for an Internet tablet since before 2000. An early model was test manufactured in 2001, the Nokia M510, which was running on EPOC and featuring an Opera browser, speakers and a 10-inch 800x600 screen, but it was not released because of fears that the market was not ready for it. The M510 was first leaked to the public in 2014.

Prior to the introduction of Nokia's Internet tablets, Nokia unveiled two "media devices" in 2003-04 which were mobile phones but had a form factor similar to the Internet tablets that followed them. The first of this type of device was the Nokia 7700 which was intended for mass production but ended up being canned in favor of the Nokia 7710 which had a slightly more traditional form-factor and better specs.

Maemo 

Nokia Internet Tablets run the Debian Linux-based Maemo, which draws much of its GUI, frameworks, and libraries from the GNOME project. It uses the embedded-targeted Matchbox as its window manager and uses Hildon, a lightweight GTK-based toolkit designed for handheld devices, as its GUI and application framework.

Alternative distributions 

Maemo can be replaced entirely by a number of other Linux distributions.

 NITdroid is a port of Google's Android.
 Ubuntu has been ported.
 Mer is a new distribution created by combining Ubuntu with the open source packages from Maemo.
 Gentoo an unofficial port of Gentoo Linux is available.

Models

See also 
 Internet appliance
 Mobile Internet device
 Tablet computer
 WiMAX
 CrunchPad
 SmartQ 5
 Nokia N1
 Nokia Lumia 2520
 Nokia T20

Notes

External links 
 Ari Jaaksi's Blog, Nokia's director of open source software operations
 Internet Tablet Talk, an active web forum about Nokia's Internet Tablets (obsolete, see next)
 talk-maemo-org TMO, the new URL of "Internet Tablet Talk"
 , tutorials for Internet Tablet users

Information appliances